The 1938–39 Divizia A was the twenty-seventh season of Divizia A, the top-level football league of Romania.

Teams

League table

Results

Top goalscorers

Champion squad

See also 

 1938–39 Divizia B

References

External links
romaniansoccer.ro

Liga I seasons
Romania
1938–39 in Romanian football